The Lady Margaret's Professor of Divinity is the oldest professorship at the University of Cambridge. It was founded initially as a readership by Lady Margaret Beaufort, mother of King Henry VII, in 1502. Since its re-endowment at the end of the 20th century, it is now specifically a chair in New Testament and early Christian studies.

There is also a Lady Margaret Professor of Divinity at the University of Oxford.

List of Lady Margaret's Professors

Dates shown are date of election.

Notes

External links

Faculty of Divinity, University of Cambridge
Selected Lady Margaret's Professors of Divinity

 
Divinity, Margaret's, Lady
Divinity, Margaret's, Lady
School of Arts and Humanities, University of Cambridge
1502 establishments in England